Bombing of Singapore may refer to:
Bombing of Singapore (1941), the first Japanese air raid on the city
Raids conducted during the Malayan Campaign and the Battle of Singapore (29 December 1941 to 15 February 1942)
Bombing of Singapore (1944–1945), raids conducted by United States and British aircraft prior to the city's liberation at the end of the war
MacDonald House bombing, bombing conducted by a group of Indonesian soldiers